Thomas Allan of Lauriston FRS FRSE FSA FLS (17 July 1777 – 12 September 1833) was a British mineralogist.

Life
Allan was born in Edinburgh, Scotland, on 17 July 1777, the son of Robert Allan (1748–1818), a banker. He was educated at the High School of Edinburgh and took up banking as profession; but he is remembered today for his contributions to mineral science.

At an early age Allan became fascinated with minerals and he began to accumulate a large mineral collection that was subsequently bequeathed to his son Robert Allan FRSE. This collection was later incorporated into Robert Greg's, which was ultimately acquired by the British Museum of Natural History in the mid-nineteenth century.

In 1813, Allan was influential in securing a mineralogy post in the Dublin Philosophical Society for the German mineralogist Karl Ludwig Giesecke (1761–1833). Allan was elected as Fellow of the Royal Society of Edinburgh in 1805, his proposers being Sir James Hall, William Wright and John Playfair. He was elected a Fellow of the Royal Society of London in 1815. He served as Curator to the RSE 1812–20 and Treasurer 1821–33.

In 1810, his contribution to mineralogy was acknowledged with a new mineral species from Greenland, being named "Allanite" in his honour by Thomas Thomson.

His Edinburgh address in later life was 11 Royal Exchange.

Allan died at Linden Hall at Morpeth, Northumberland, England, on 12 September 1833. He is buried in St Cuthberts Churchyard in Edinburgh. His son, Robert Allan (1806–1863) was also a mineralogist.

Works
Allan contributed the "Diamond" article for the fifth edition of the  Encyclopædia Britannica as well as the work on mineralogical nomenclature An Alphabetical List of the Names of Minerals, at Present Most Familiar in the English, French, and German Languages, with Tables of Analyses (Edinburgh, 1805, followed by enlarged editions in 1808, 1814, and 1819).

References

Anonymous., [Obituary of Thomas Allan], Philosophical Magazine, 3rd Series, 3 (1833), pp. 317–318.
Farrar, W.V. and K.R. Farrar., "Thomas Allan, mineralogist: an autobiographical fragment,"  Annals of Science, 24 (1968), no. 2, pp. 115–20.

1777 births
1833 deaths
Scottish mineralogists
Fellows of the Royal Society
Scientists from Edinburgh
Fellows of the Royal Society of Edinburgh